Caixão Grande is a town on São Tomé Island in the nation of São Tomé and Príncipe. Its population is 1,021 (2012 census). It lies about 5 km southwest of the national capital São Tomé.

Population history

Sporting clubs
Caixão Grande is home to Bairros Unidos FC (also known as Caixão Grande) that plays in the São Tomé Island League.

References

Populated places in Mé-Zóchi District